St Gregory's Minster is an Anglo-Saxon church with a rare sundial, in Kirkdale near Kirkbymoorside, Vale of Pickering, North Yorkshire, England. It is a Grade I listed building.

The minster was built  on the site of an earlier church, and is dedicated to St Gregory, who was pope from 590 to 604. Major modifications were completed in the 15th century and in the 1800s. The church was restored during 1907–1909. The building is similar in style and age to that of St Hilda's, Ellerburn.

The church is open during the day; volunteer stewards provide information to visitors and services are offered weekly. The maintenance of the fabric of the building is helped by financial contributions from The Friends of St Gregory's Minster. The Friends' Annual General Meeting is followed by the Kirkdale Lecture about the parish and its environs.

Parish status

The Parish of Kirkdale is a local ecumenical partnership with
St Saviour's Church, Harome
St Hilda's Church, Beadlam
All Saints’ Church, Nunnington
St John the Baptist's Church, Pockley

Sundial

The sundial above the church door dates to the 11th century. The inscription is in Anglo-Saxon and is translated as follows by Historic England: "Orm Gamal's son bought St. Gregory's Minster when it was all broken down and fallen and he let it be made anew from the ground to Christ and St. Gregory, in Edward's days, the king, and in Tosti's days, the Earl. This is day's Sun marker at every tide. And Haworth me wrought and Brand, priests." The name Tosti refers to Tostig Godwinson, the Earl who rebuilt a monastery in Tynemouth Castle and Priory at Tynemouth, during the reign of Edward the Confessor, in about 1065.

References

External links

 

"Kirkdale", Ormerod.uk.net, description of the Minster reproduced from guides published by the Parochial Church Council

Kirkdale
Kirkdale
Kirkdale
Kirkdale
Kirkdale